George Osmund Caine (16 July 1914 – 11 November 2004) was an artist, art teacher and stained-glass designer.

Caine was born in Manchester, England and studied at the Birmingham School of Art. He taught art at the Kingston School of Art, and then at Twickenham College of Technology, where he founded its graphic design school.

In 1948 he moved to a house on Kingston Hill, where he lived with his wife Mary whom he married in 1944. They had four sons and a daughter.

Works
Caine's paintings have been described as “more Stanley Spencer than Stanley Spencer”. His works include:
Wedding at Twickenham Parish Church (1948), which is in the London Borough of Richmond upon Thames Art Collection
Zebras, Chessington Zoo, Surrey, which is at Kingston History Centre in the Royal Borough of Kingston upon Thames 
Spider Hutments, Mychett Barracks, Aldershot 1940, which is in the British Government Art Collection
 The Grand Union Canal, Brentford Lock, painted in 1954, which is in the British Government Art Collection

The most extensive collection of Caine's stained glass is at the Grade II* listed All Saints' Church, Four Oaks in Bellwell Lane, Birmingham. Caine also designed the stained glass east window to the chancel of the Church of St Cuthbert in Portsmouth.

References

1914 births
2004 deaths
20th-century English painters
21st-century English painters
Academics of Kingston University
Alumni of the Birmingham School of Art
Artists from Manchester
British art teachers
English male painters
English stained glass artists and manufacturers
20th-century English male artists
21st-century English male artists